An amphitheatre is an open-air venue used for entertainment, performances, and sports.

Amphitheatre or Amphitheater may also refer to:

Australia
Amphitheatre, New South Wales, a civil parish
Amphitheatre, Victoria, a town
The Amphitheatre, a geographical feature in Hallett Cove Conservation Park, South Australia

Other places
Amphitheatre (Drakensberg), a geographical feature in Northern Drakensberg, South Africa
Amphitheatre (London), the remains of a Roman amphitheatre in London, England
The Amphitheatre, a basin in Graham Land, Antarctica

See also
 Amphitheatre Lake (disambiguation)
 Amphitheater Mountain (disambiguation)
 
 
 :Category:Amphitheaters
 List of contemporary amphitheatres